Aronen is a Finnish surname. Notable people with the surname include:

Eeva-Kaarina Aronen (1948–2015), Finnish author and journalist
Nestori Aronen (1876–1954), Finnish politician
Toivo Aronen (1886–1973), Finnish politician

Finnish-language surnames